Manami Takada (born 9 September 1988) is a Japanese woman cricketer. She made her international debut in the 2013 ICC Women's World Twenty20 Qualifier. Manami also competed at the 2014 Asian Games representing the national team.

References

External links 
 
 Profile at CricHQ

1988 births
Living people
Sportspeople from Tokyo
Japanese women cricketers
Cricketers at the 2014 Asian Games
Asian Games competitors for Japan